Takayuki Okada   (May 8, 1973 – August 8, 2003), more widely known as Giant Ochiai, was a Japanese professional wrestler and mixed martial artist. Okada's MMA record was 3-3-2 (win–loss–draw).

Career
As a student, Okada won the All Japan Industrial High School Judo League Championship four times. After graduating from college, he went to train at the Seidokaikan Tokyo Bom-Ba-Ye dojo with Naoyuki Taira. He also joined the amateur division of Shooto, placing second in its All Japan Amateur Shooto Championship in 1998 and 1999.

In 2000, after Seidokaikan mainstay Masaaki Satake tried his luck in PRIDE Fighting Championships, Okada followed him in order to do his own debut. He gained the ring name of "Giant Ochiai", sporting shades and a large afro wig over his actual afro hair during his entrances, which drew popularity among the fans. The origin of the name would be found in his large height and weight and his mother's maiden name, Ochiai.

Ochiai trained with former Shooto founder Satoru Sayama and got to participate in his Ultimate Boxing event, a month later he debuted in PRIDE, fighting Ricco Rodriguez in a losing effort. His performance, however, was remarkable, defending multiple submission attempts and only being taken down for a failed judo throw, until he was submitted by smother choke. He continued fighting for PRIDE, defeating karate stylist Soichi Nishida and professional wrestler Tomohiko Hashimoto, as well as Pancrase exponent Kim Jong Wang. He would also fight in King of the Cage.

Also in 2000, Ochiai debuted in professional wrestling, working sporadically in the stiff style Battlarts organizations. He joined Riki Choshu's World Japan promotion for proper training.

Death
After an August 2003 training accident while training with Kenzo Suzuki at World Japan's dojo, Okada suffered an acute subdural hematoma and entered a coma from which he never recovered.  Okada died on August 8, 2003. Okada's August 13 wake was attended by Masaaki Satake, Nobuhiko Takada, Kazushi Sakuraba and World Japan Management Director Katsuji Nagashima. A moment of silence was held in PRIDE Grand Prix 2003 in his honor.

Mixed martial arts record

|-
| Draw
| align=center|3-3-2
| Memo Diaz
| Draw
| Deep - 9th Impact
| 
| align=center|2
| align=center|5:00
| Tokyo, Japan
| 
|-
| Win
| align=center|3-3-1
| Kim Jong Wang
| Submission (broken hand)
| Pride FC: The Best, Vol. 3
| 
| align=center|1
| align=center|0:24
| Tokyo, Japan
| 
|-
| Win
| align=center|2-3-1
| Tomohiko Hashimoto
| KO (strikes)
| Pride The Best Vol.2
| 
| align=center|1
| align=center|2:10
| Tokyo, Japan
| 
|-
| Win
| align=center|1-3-1
| Soichi Nishida
| TKO (punches)
| Pride The Best Vol.1
| 
| align=center|1
| align=center|2:00
| Tokyo, Japan
| 
|-
| Loss
| align=center|0-3-1
| Zane Frazier
| Decision (unanimous)
| KOTC 10 - Critical Mass
| 
| align=center|1
| align=center|7:00
| San Jacinto, California, USA
| 
|-
| Draw
| align=center|0-2-1
| Yoshinori Nishi
| Draw
| S - Samurai 2000
| 
| align=center|N/A
| 
| Tokyo, Japan
| 
|-
| Loss
| align=center|0-2
| Ricco Rodriguez
| Submission (smother choke)
| Pride 10 - Return of the Warriors
| 
| align=center|1
| align=center|6:04
| Saitama, Japan
| 
|-
| Loss
| align=center|0-1
| Igor Borisov
| TKO (punches)
| Ultimate Boxing - Pride vs Seikendo
| 
| align=center|1
| align=center|7:07
| Yokohama, Japan
|

References

External links

 PrideFC Page

1973 births
2003 deaths
People from Oga, Akita
Japanese male professional wrestlers
Japanese male mixed martial artists
Super heavyweight mixed martial artists
Mixed martial artists utilizing Seidokaikan
Mixed martial artists utilizing wrestling
Mixed martial artists utilizing judo
Japanese male judoka